The Whoridas are hip hop duo from Oakland, California consisting of cousins King Saan (Hasaan Mahmoud) aka ChopBlack and Mr. Taylor (Meiko Taylor). King Saan is the younger brother of the MC known as Saafir.

Discography

Studio albums 
 Whoridin''' (1997)
 High Times (1999)
 Corner Store'' (2002)

Singles 
 "Shot Callin' & Big Ballin'" (1996)
 "Talkin' Bout Bank" (1997)
 "Get Lifted" (1998)
 "Dock of Bay" (1999)

References

External links 
Discogs entry on The WhoRidas
Mr. Taylor on Twitter
King Saan on Twitter

Gangsta rap groups
Hip hop duos
Musical groups from Oakland, California